Main Bhi Ardhangini ( I am also yours) is an Indian television series that aired from 21 January 2019 to 1 November 2019 on And TV. It is the official remake of Zee Tamil's Yaaradi Nee Mohini. It starred Avinash Sachdev, Aditi Rawat, Anjali Priya, and Deepshikha Nagpal.

Season one ended on 27 July 2019 and focused on the union of Madhav and Vaidehi through the power of Madhav's ex-wife and the resistance of Madhav's mother. Season two began on 30 July 2019 and ended on 1 November 2019 shifting its focus on horror and thriller. Season two brought the addition of new cast.

Series overview

Plot

Season 1 
Madhav is a widower who lives with the memories of his beloved wife Chitra. However, her spirit returns to haunt those who did her wrong and also tries to unite Madhav with his childhood friend Vaidehi.

Cast

Season 1
 Avinash Sachdev as Madhav Singh Thakur
 Aditi Rawat as Vaidehi Sharma / Vaidehi Madhav Singh Thakur
 Anjali Priya as Chitra Khanna / Chitra Madhav Singh Thakur
 Deepshikha Nagpal as Nilambari Thakur 
 Krutika Desai as Shweta
 Ajay Chakraborty as Narayandas Thakur
 Shashank Mishra as Lavish "Lalten" Joshi
 Gulshan Tushir as Jaichand
 Adityarao Nuniwal as Sangram Thakur
 Diksha Dhami as Anuradha Sangram Thakur

Season 2
 Ankit Raj as Adhiraj, an Eagle
 Heena Parmar as Mohini / Malmal
 Deepshikha Nagpal as Mahamaya Nilambari
 Saloni Jain as Fauzia
 Meer Ali as Naagraj Bhujang
 Megha Rawat as Vasudha
 Rahul Trivedi as Chander
 Rohit Bakshi as Vikrant
 Tejaswi Bhadane as Vikrant's daughter

Adaptations

References

External links
 

2019 Indian television series debuts
&TV original programming
Indian horror fiction television series
Ghosts in television
Hindi-language television series based on Tamil-language television series